The Arkansas Public Service Commission (APSC) regulates the service and rates of those utilities subject to its jurisdiction in the State of Arkansas, United States. It was originally created by the Arkansas General Assembly on March 11, 1899, as the Arkansas Railroad Commission and was limited to regulating the railroads. Today the APSC regulates telephone service, natural gas lines, pipeline safety, and electricity.

External links
 

1899 establishments in Arkansas
Government agencies established in 1899
Arkansas
Public Service Commission, Arkansas